The 51st season of the Campeonato Gaúcho kicked off on January 24, 1971, and ended on September 22, 1971. Twenty-five teams participated. Internacional won their 19th title.

Participating teams

System 
The championship would have two stages.:

 Preliminary phase: Twenty-five clubs would be divided into two groups - one with thirteen teams and one with twelve. each team played the teams in its group and the other group once. The four best teams in each group qualified to the octogonal.
 Octogonal: The remaining eight teams would play each other in a double round-robin format. The team with the most points won the title.

Championship

Preliminary phase

Group A

Group B

Octogonal

References 

Campeonato Gaúcho seasons
Gaúcho